This article is a list of diseases of almonds (Prunus dulcis).

Bacterial diseases

Mycoplasmal diseases

Phytoplasmal diseases

Fungal diseases
For treatment in the US, see Fungicide use in the United States#Almonds.

Nematode diseases
Nematode diseases of almond include:

Viral diseases
Viruses infecting almond include:

Miscellaneous diseases and disorders
Unknown or non-infectious disorders include:

References

Common Names of Diseases, The American Phytopathological Society
The Almond Doctor University of California Cooperative Extension Website containing descriptions of almond diseases and pests.

Almond